The 1982 Primera División season was the 91st season of top-flight football in Argentina. Estudiantes (LP) won the Metropolitano (3rd title) while Ferro Carril Oeste (1st title) won the Nacional championship. 

Quilmes and Sarmiento (Junín) were relegated.

Metropolitano Championship

Nacional Championship

Group A

Group B

Group C

Group D

Quarterfinals

|-
|}

Semifinals

|-
|}

Final

|-
|}

 Ferro Carril Oeste won 2–0 on aggregate.

First leg

2nd leg

References

Argentine Primera División seasons
1
Arg
p
p